858 El Djezaïr  is a stony asteroid from the asteroid belt, about 24 kilometers in diameter. It was discovered on May 26, 1916, by French astronomer Frédéric Sy at the Algiers Observatory in Algeria, North Africa, and given the provisional designation 1916 a.

The asteroid orbits the Sun at a distance of 2.5–3.1 AU once every 4.71 years (1,722 days). The bright S-type asteroid has a very high geometric albedo of 0.32. Its rotation period has been measured to take 22 hours and 20 minutes. Along with the asteroids 68 Leto and 236 Honoria, it is a member of the Leto family, a small, well-defined group of asteroids, all with a semi-major axis of close to 2.8 AU.

El Djezaïr is the French spelling of the Arabic name for Algiers, the capital of Algeria. It means "the islands". The asteroid was the first minor planet to receive a name that consists of more than one word. Its designation, 1916 a, is a superseded version of the modern two-letter code system of provisional designation, implemented just a few years later in 1925.

References

External links 
 Lightcurve plot of 858 El Djezair, Palmer Divide Observatory, B. D. Warner (2005)
 Asteroid Lightcurve Database (LCDB), query form (info )
 Dictionary of Minor Planet Names, Google books
 Asteroids and comets rotation curves, CdR – Observatoire de Genève, Raoul Behrend
 Discovery Circumstances: Numbered Minor Planets (1)-(5000) – Minor Planet Center
 
 

000858
Discoveries by Frédéric Sy
Named minor planets
000858
19160526